The Papua and New Guinea Act 1949 was an Act passed by the Parliament of Australia. It replaced the Papua Act 1905 and the New Guinea Act 1920, and changed the status of the territories of Papua and New Guinea by merging their administrations to form Papua and New Guinea. The Act established local rule, although the territory remained under control by Australia. The Act was repealed by the Papua New Guinea Independence Act 1975 which allowed for Papua New Guinea's independence from Australia.

References

Australia and the Commonwealth of Nations
Politics of Papua and New Guinea
1949 in Australian law
1949 in Papua New Guinea
1949 in international relations
Papua New Guinea and the Commonwealth of Nations
Repealed Acts of the Parliament of Australia
Territory of Papua and New Guinea